John Coalter Bates (August 26, 1842 – February 4, 1919) was a United States Army officer who served as Chief of Staff of the United States Army from January to April 1906. Along with Arthur MacArthur Jr., Bates was one of the last American Civil War veterans still on active duty in the United States military at the time of his retirement.

Early life and education
Bates was born in St. Charles County, Missouri to congressman and future Attorney General Edward Bates and Julia Davenport Coalter. He was educated at Washington University in St. Louis. He was commissioned a first lieutenant with the 11th Infantry Regiment in May 1861 and later became an aide to General George G. Meade, reaching the brevet rank of lieutenant colonel for gallant and meritorious service in operations resulting in the capture of Richmond and surrender of General Robert E. Lee’s army in April 1865.

Military career
 
Bates later served on the Indian Frontier for many years (being promoted to major in 1882 and to lieutenant colonel in 1886), was made a colonel of the 2nd Infantry Regiment in 1892, and in May 1898 was promoted to brigadier general of an Independent Brigade consisting of the 3rd Infantry Regiment and 20th Infantry Regiment in the Spanish–American War and commanded a division of volunteers in the Philippines in the early stages of the Philippine–American War. He was military governor of Cienfuegos in 1899, went that year to the Philippines, where he conducted the negotiations with the Sultan of Sulu. From 1900–1901, he commanded the 1st Division, Eighth Army Corps, conducted operations against insurgents in southern Luzon, and then commanded that department.
 
Bates commanded a provisional division in maneuvers at Fort Riley and commanded the Departments of the Missouri and the Lakes from 1901–1904 and later the Northern Division for a year before serving as Chief of Staff of the United States Army from January 15 to April 13, 1906. During this time, he was promoted to Lieutenant general. He retired from active service in April 1906 at his own request, shortly before having reached the mandatory retirement age of 64. He was the last Army Chief of Staff to have served in the American Civil War.

Later life and death
Bates was a member of the Military Order of the Loyal Legion of the United States and the Grand Army of the Republic. He died in San Diego, California on February 4, 1919.

Dates of rank

See also
 Kiram-Bates Treaty

References

 John Coulter Bates at the United States Army Center of Military History
 Arlington National Cemetery

1842 births
1919 deaths
United States Army generals
Union Army officers
People from St. Charles County, Missouri
United States Army Chiefs of Staff
American military personnel of the Philippine–American War
American people of the Indian Wars
Washington University in St. Louis alumni
Burials at Arlington National Cemetery
Military personnel from Missouri